DXGD (549 AM)  is a radio station owned and operated by Sulu-Tawi-Tawi Broadcasting Foundation, the media arm of the Apostolic Vicariate of Jolo. The station's studio is located along Circumferential Rd., Brgy. Bongao Poblacion, Bongao, Tawi-Tawi.

It began as a media apostolate of the Missionary Oblates of Mary Immaculate, a religious congregation of men pioneering in missions in the Mindanao and Sulu archipelago regions.

References

Radio stations in Tawi-Tawi
Radio stations established in 1948
1948 establishments in the Philippines
Catholic radio stations